The Dirties is a 2013 Canadian found footage thriller film and the directorial debut of Matt Johnson. It has received praise from critics as well as numerous awards, including the Grand Jury Prize for Best Narrative at the 2013 Slamdance Film Festival. Kevin Smith, who helped distribute the film, dubbed The Dirties "the most important movie you will see all year."

Plot
The film opens with the main characters, Matt and Owen, making a movie about a gang of bullies and the revenge that two victimized students take on them. This project, The Dirties, contains references to a score of other movies such as Being John Malkovich, Pulp Fiction, and The Usual Suspects. Matt is shown being bullied.

Afterwards, Matt asks some members of the student body, as well as faculty members at the school, about what someone should do if they are getting bullied. The students see that getting help is much more difficult than the faculty members perceive it to be. Matt and Owen are then shown editing clips together for their film, during the course of which it is revealed that a popular girl, Chrissy, had a crush on Owen in grade three. Matt and Owen shoot more scenes for their film project, and Matt has Owen attempt to look cool in front of Chrissy to see if she still likes him.

After finishing filming, the rough cut of the project is brought to the film teacher, Mr. Muldoon. The movie is revealed to contain Matt and Owen shooting and killing other students, as well as their teacher, in addition to containing a large amount of expletives. Muldoon demands the film be changed.

The edited version of the film is shown in class, and Matt leaves the room in humiliation, while Owen puts his head down while the rest of the class talks and laughs through the entire movie. On their walk home from school, Owen has a rock thrown at his head. As Owen is icing his head back at Matt's, Matt suggests that the movie would have been better if the two had actually shot the Dirties within their movie with real guns.

Matt erases the script for The Dirties from his whiteboard, and proceeds to begin working on The Dirties II. Owen begins to practice the guitar more in attempts to win over Chrissy, and the boys are shown being bullied some more. Matt then acquires blueprints of his high school from the library for the school project he told them he was doing, which Matt points out was concerningly easy to do, and that his school ID was never even checked. Owen is then shown having a lunch dumped on him and being slapped across the face by another student.

The boys go out at night and create a bonfire, where they reflect on being bullied. Matt measures the lockers and takes photos, which Owen sees as suspicious. Matt says that it is entirely inconspicuous, and goes as far to tell Chrissy that they were planning a school shooting and gets Chrissy's number for Owen. Owen calls Chrissy and says he is at a party, at Matt's suggestion. The two go to a cottage and fire guns together with Matt's cousin, shooting targets consisting of milk jugs, melons, and a propane tank bomb. They bake a cake for Chrissy, and Matt gets upset with Owen for sharing it with the Dirties.

Matt is seen reading Columbine, and checks out six copies of Catcher in the Rye "to seem crazy." Owen gets concerned that Matt's basement has plans and pictures of people he plans to shoot in the movie. Owen tells Matt that he is "always acting" and that he is not always in a movie.

Matt self-diagnoses himself as a psychopath, which he glorifies as he reads Columbine. Owen, having had enough of Matt's attitude, berates him for his attitude towards things, leading to an argument between the two. Matt indignantly responds that Chrissy doesn't care about him and that she exists in Owen's life because of "his plans", but Owen takes a firm stand and asserts that Matt is jealous of him because he has no other friends. Owen then takes off his wireless microphone and leaves, much to the dismay of Matt.

Matt has a conversation with his mother where he asks if she thinks he is crazy. His mom says that crazy technically means that someone loses their ability to tell their thoughts from reality and the real world. Matt goes, alone, to the place where he and Owen had the bonfire and burns all of his notebooks. Owen tries calling Matt, who ignores it. Matt goes to the school with a duffel bag full of his cousins firearms entering through a stairwell. He then sets up cameras, shoots Josh and Jackman, and chases Owen. Matt enters a dark classroom where Owen is cornered trying to open a locked door, Matt simply asks, "What are you doing? It's me!"

Cast

Production
The film had a production budget of $10,000. After finishing production, an additional $45,000 was needed to secure licensing rights for the music used in the film. All the film's financing came "out of pocket."

There was almost no scripted dialogue and several scenes were shot without some of the participants' awareness.

Release
The Dirties was released by the Kevin Smith Movie Club and has been screened at the TIFF Bell Lightbox theater in Toronto.

The film has been released on a limited basis in a DVD/Blu-ray triple disk edition, but is also available for streaming on Netflix.

Reception

The review aggregator website Rotten Tomatoes gave the film an 81% "fresh" rating, based on 36 reviews. The website's consensus reads, "The Dirties uses likable characters and a surprisingly twisted story to deconstruct the power of violent revenge -- and the audience's expectations when viewing it." On Metacritic, based on reviews from 14 critics, the film has a 65/100 rating, indicating "generally favorable reviews".

The Toronto Star called The Dirties "a fresh, compelling take on bullying," rating it three stars out of four. The Globe and Mail called it "a bravura debut for an up-and-coming Canadian filmmaker," also rating it three stars out of four.

Accolades
The film was a finalist for Best Canadian Film at the Toronto Film Critics Association Awards 2013, alongside Gabrielle and the eventual winner, Watermark.

References

External links
 
 
 

2013 films
2013 comedy-drama films
Canadian black comedy films
Canadian teen films
Canadian comedy-drama films
English-language Canadian films
Films about bullying
Films about school violence
Films set in schools
Films shot in Toronto
Canadian independent films
SModcast Pictures films
Found footage films
2013 black comedy films
2013 independent films
2010s English-language films
2010s Canadian films